Cedar Hill is an unincorporated community and census-designated place in San Juan County, New Mexico, United States. Its population was 847 as of the 2010 census. The community is located on U.S. Route 550, near the Colorado border. Cedar Hill was originally known as Cox's Crossing. The name was chosen during a Literacy Society meeting by picking names out of a hat. A post office operated from 1892 to 1966.

Geography

Demographics

Education
The school district is Aztec Municipal Schools. Aztec High School is the local high school.

References

Census-designated places in New Mexico
Census-designated places in San Juan County, New Mexico